Gerstle may refer to:

People with the family name
Frank Gerstle (1915–1970), American actor.
Gary Gerstle, American academic.

Location
Gerstle Cove State Marine Reserve, protected area in California, USA.